Nuapada Airstrip, also known as Gotma Airstrip,  is a public airstrip located at Nandapur in the Nuapada district of Odisha. Nearest airport to this airstrip is Swami Vivekananda Airport in Raipur, Chhattisgarh.

References

Airports in Odisha
Nuapada district
Airports with year of establishment missing